Heliaster solaris commonly known as 24-rayed sunstar is a possibly extinct sea star which was known from the waters near Española Island in the Galápagos Islands.

Description
Heliaster solaris had 22 to 24 cylindrical and elongated more or less distinctly banded rays which were tapering at the ends. They were one third longer than the diameter of the body. The dorsal rows of the spines were longer and more compressed. The spines, pedicellariae, and the madreporic plate were light yellowish.

Taxonomy
This species was first mentioned by John Edward Gray in 1840 in the Annals and Magazine of Natural History as Asterias multiradiata and later as Heliaster multiradiatus. Due to the fact that Carl Linnaeus used the name Asterias multiradiata (current accepted name: Capillaster multiradiata) already in 1758 Gray's name became an invalid homonym. In 1920 Austin Hobart Clark published the replacement name Heliaster solaris.

Extinction
Heliaster solaris disappeared during the El Niño Southern Oscillation event which affected the Galapagos Islands in the early 1980s.

References
John Edward Gray: Mr. J. E. Gray's Synopsis of the Genera and Species of Starfish In: Annals and Magazine of Natural History Volume 6, 1840. p. 180
Austin Hobart Clark: A New Name for Heliaster multiradiatus (Gray). In: Proceedings of the Biological Society of Washington, 1920. p. 183
Graham J. Edgar et al.: El Niño, grazers and fisheries interact to greatly elevate extinction risk for Galapagos marine species In: Global Change Biology 23 October 2009

External links
Photograph and news article

Heliasteridae
Extinct invertebrates since 1500
Animals described in 1920
Galápagos Islands coastal fauna
Taxa named by Austin Hobart Clark